Planets is the ninth studio album by Eloy, released in 1981. It was the last album with the drummer and percussionist Jim McGillivray. It was the first Eloy album to be issued in the UK, through the Wolverhampton-based Heavy Metal Worldwide label, with alternative artwork by Rodney Matthews.

Track listing 
All music by Eloy, all lyrics by Sigi Hausen and Frank Bornemann.
Side One
 "Introduction" – 1:58
 "On the Verge of Darkening Lights" – 5:37
 "Point of No Return" – 5:45
 "Mysterious Monolith" – 7:40
Side Two
"Queen of the Night" – 5:22
 "At the Gates of Dawn" (Instrumental) – 4:17
 "Sphinx" – 6:50
 "Carried by Cosmic Winds" – 4:32

Personnel
 Frank Bornemann — electric and acoustic guitars, lead vocals
 Hannes Arkona — electric and acoustic guitars, keyboards
 Hannes Folberth — keyboards
 Klaus-Peter Matziol — bass guitar, backing vocals
 Jim McGillivray — drums, percussion

References

External links

1981 albums
Albums with cover art by Rodney Matthews
Eloy (band) albums
EMI Records albums